Ogygites is a genus of Ordovician trilobites in the family Asaphidae, with the type species Ogygites desmaresti. Species of Ogygites include the following:
Ogygites canadensis
Ogygites corndensis from Wales
Ogygites desmaresti from southern France
Ogygites guettardi from southern France
Ogygites nobilis

References

Asaphidae
Asaphida genera
Ordovician trilobites of Europe
Paleozoic life of Nunavut